Veston Goff "Bunky" Stewart (January 7, 1931 – October 3, 2007) was an American professional baseball player, a pitcher for the Washington Senators between  and .  He accumulated five wins, eleven losses, and three saves over 72 games pitched.  The ,  left-hander was born in Jasper, Craven County, North Carolina, and attended East Carolina University.

Before debuting in the Major League, he played for the New Bern Bears of the Coastal Plain League. In his final season, Stewart pitched 105 innings, winning five games, and saving two. He also hit .250 with 2 RBIs in 28 at bats in '56.

After his playing days, he worked in retail and in real estate. He died on October 3, 2007 in Wilmington, North Carolina.

References

External links

1931 births
2007 deaths
Baseball players from North Carolina
Chattanooga Lookouts players
East Carolina University alumni
Macon Peaches players
Major League Baseball pitchers
Miami Marlins (IL) players
New Bern Bears players
Portsmouth-Norfolk Tides players
People from Craven County, North Carolina
Washington Senators (1901–1960) players
Wilson Tobs players